The List of Vijayanagara era temples in Karnataka includes notable and historically important Hindu and Jain temples and monoliths that were built or received significant patronage by the kings and vassals of the Vijayanagara Empire during the period 1336-1646 AD. This period includes the rule of the four dynasties: the Sangama, the Saluva, the Tuluva, and the Aravidu dynasties.

Notes
reflist

References

 Fritz, John M. and George Michell (editors), New Light on Hampi: Recent Research at Vijayanagar, 2001, MARG Publication, Mumbai, 
Biswas C. Subhas (2014), India the Land of Gods, Partridge Publishing, New Delhi, 
Kamat Suryanatha U (2001): A Concise history of Karnataka from pre-historic times to the present, Jupiter Books, MCC, Bangalore (Reprinted 2002), OCLC: 7796041

Titze, Kurt; Bruhn, Klaus: Jainism: A Pictorial Guide to the Religion of Non-violence, Motilal Banarsidass Publication, 1998, 
Muthanna I.M. (1977): Karnataka, history, administration & culture, Lotus Printers, Bangalore
Rajan, Soundara K.V. (2001):Concise Classified Dictionary of Hinduism, Concept Publishing, new Delhi, 
Michell George (1995):Architecture and Art of Southern India:Vijayanagara and the Successor States, Volume 1, 
Michell, George (1995):The New Cambridge History of India, Volumes 1-6, Cambridge University Press, Cambridge, 
Michell, George (2013), Southern India: A Guide to Monuments Sites & Museums, Roli Books, 
 Fritz, John M., Michell, George (editors, 2001): New Light on Hampi, Recent research in Vijayanagara, MARG Publications 
Verghese, Anila (2002), Hampi (Monumental Legacy), Oxford University Press, 

Raman, Afried (1994): Bangalore - Mysore: A Disha Guide. Bangalore: Orient Blackswan, .
Pieris, Sita and Raven, Ellen M (2010), ABIA:South and Southeast Asian Art and Archaeology Index: Volume Three – South Asia, BRILL 
Ahmed, Farooqui Salma, A Comprehensive History of Medieval India: Twelfth to the Mid-Eighteenth Century, 2011, New Delhi, Pearson Education India 
 Hampi travel guide (2003). New Delhi: Good Earth publication & Department of Tourism, India. , 

 

Vijayanagara era temples, Karnataka
Vijayanagara era temples
Temples in Karnataka
Vijayanagara era temples